Jamsi (also Romanized as Jamsī and Jemsy; also known as Jamshi and Jamshīd) is a village in Hashivar Rural District, in the Central District of Darab County, Fars Province, Iran. At the 2006 census, its population was 1,365, in 276 families.

References 

Populated places in Darab County